Turicchia is an Italian surname. Notable people with the surname include:

 Alain Turicchia (born 1975), Italian cyclist
 Riccardo Turicchia (born 2003), Italian footballer

Italian-language surnames